Jon Pineda (born Charleston, South Carolina) is an American poet, memoirist, and novelist.

Life
Jon Pineda was raised in Chesapeake, Virginia.
He graduated from James Madison University and Virginia Commonwealth University.

His work has appeared in Poetry Northwest, The Literary Review, Sou'wester, Prairie Schooner, Many Mountains Moving, Asian Pacific American Journal, Puerto del Sol, and elsewhere.

He is the author of the novel Apology, winner of the 2013 Milkweed National Fiction Prize.  His memoir Sleep in Me was a 2010 Barnes & Noble Discover Great New Writers selection.  His poetry collections include Little Anodynes, winner of the 2016 Library of Virginia Literary Award for Poetry, The Translator's Diary, winner of the 2007 Green Rose Prize for Poetry from New Issues Press, and Birthmark, first-place winner in the 2003 Crab Orchard Series in Poetry Open Competition Awards.

He currently teaches in the low-residency MFA program at Queens University of Charlotte and is Director of the Creative Writing program at the College of William & Mary.

Awards
 2016 Library of Virginia Literary Award for Poetry
 2013 Milkweed National Fiction Prize
 2010 Barnes & Noble "Discover Great New Writers" Selection
 2007 Green Rose Prize from New Issues Press
 2003 Crab Orchard Series in Poetry Open Competition Awards
 Fellowship, Virginia Commission for the Arts Individual Artist

Books

Individual Works
 "My Sister, Who Died Young, Takes Up the Task", Poetry Foundation
 "The Muse, or Stars Out on Interstate 81 South", Poetry Foundation
 "Cinque Terre", Poetry Foundation

Anthologies

References

External links

 "Author's website"
 "Jon Pineda Q&A on his favorite writing time", Fishouse
 "Jon Pineda",  Kate Greenstreet, First Book Interviews

Year of birth missing (living people)
Living people
James Madison University alumni
Virginia Commonwealth University alumni
Queens University of Charlotte faculty
Old Dominion University faculty